Events in the year 1989 in Switzerland.

Incumbents
Federal Council:
Otto Stich 
Jean-Pascal Delamuraz (President)
Elisabeth Kopp then Kaspar Villiger
Arnold Koller 
Flavio Cotti
René Felber 
Adolf Ogi

Births
 4 January - Kariem Hussein, 400 metres hurdler
 13 June - Dino Wieser.
 14 July - Dominique Rinderknecht.
 28 August - Doris Schweizer.
 7 November - Tina Aeberli.

Deaths

 6 April - Michael Reusch.
 November - Édouard Candeveau.

References

 
Years of the 20th century in Switzerland
1980s in Switzerland